Agnes Callard (born 1976) is an American philosopher and an associate professor of philosophy at the University of Chicago. Her primary areas of specialization are ancient philosophy and ethics. She is also noted for her popular writings and work on public philosophy.

Early life and education 
Callard was born on January 6, 1976, in Budapest, Hungary. Her mother was a hematologist and oncologist in the 1980s, specializing in the treatment of AIDS at the time. Her father started as a carpet salesman and retired as a steel exporter. Callard was raised in Budapest until the age of six. She and her parents later moved to Rome before settling in the New York metropolitan area.

She earned a Bachelor of Arts degree from the University of Chicago, followed by a Master of Arts in classics and a PhD in philosophy from the University of California, Berkeley. She is Jewish.

Academic career 
Callard has been a faculty member at the University of Chicago since 2008, becoming an associate professor of philosophy in 2017. She drew controversy when she crossed the picket line of Graduate Students United to work as a scab during the union's 2019 recognition strike.

With L. A. Paul, Callard received the 2020 Lebowitz Prize, awarded by the American Philosophical Association and Phi Beta Kappa. She received a Guggenheim Fellowship in 2019.

Public writing and speaking
Callard has published in the Boston Review, The New Yorker, and The New York Times, and has written a column on public philosophy for The Point magazine. Podcasts that have hosted her include EconTalk, the Elucidations Podcast, and The Ezra Klein Show.

In 2017, she created the Night Owls public debate series in Hyde Park, Chicago, featuring guests such as Tyler Cowen, Chris Blattman, Ezra Klein, Hollis Robbins; and in November 2018 participated in one with her ex-husband and colleague Ben Callard, on the philosophy of divorce.

She hosts the podcast Minds Almost Meeting together with the economist Robin Hanson.

Her 2022 tweet about throwing out her children's Halloween candy went viral.

Personal life 
In 2011, Callard divorced her husband, fellow University of Chicago professor Ben Callard, and began seeing Arnold Brooks, who was a graduate student at the time. After a year of dating, they married. Agnes has two children with Callard and one with Brooks. She lives with both her current husband and her ex-husband. She was diagnosed with autism in her 30s.

Bibliography 
 
  On Anger was selected as one of The New Yorkers "Best Books We Read in 2020".
 Question everything: a Stone reader. Peter Catapano, Simon Critchley (2022). Liveright, New York. . .

References

External links
Profile at University of Chicago

Interview at What Is It Like to be a Philosopher?
An unofficial page that links to all of her public articles up to November 7, 2022
A second fan page, based on the page above, that also links to all of her public articles and is somewhat more up to date. This second page was pinned to Callard's Twitter account soon after being first posted, and is still pinned there as of now.

1976 births
21st-century American philosophers
21st-century American women
American scholars of ancient Greek philosophy
American women philosophers
Hungarian philosophers
Living people
UC Berkeley College of Letters and Science alumni
University of Chicago alumni
University of Chicago faculty
American women academics